This is a list of commercial banks in Somaliland;

 Bank of Somaliland
 Dahabshiil Bank
 Darasalaam Bank
 Premier Bank
 Amal Bank

See also 

 List of banks in Africa

References 

Banks of Somaliland